Katelyn O'Hern Bethke (born September 3, 1988) is a retired American soccer player who last represented Swedish Damallsvenskan club Eskilstuna United DFF, having previously played for Mallbackens IF.

Club career
Bethke played for Atlanta Beat in the WPS in 2011. On July 24, 2011, Bethke signed a deal with Norwegian Toppserien club Arna-Bjørnar.

On January 19, 2012, Bethke joined German Bundesliga side Bayer 04 Leverkusen where she played 7 of the remaining season matches.

Bethke signed a contract with Avaldsnes IL in the Toppserien in January 2013.

For the 2015 season she moved to Sweden and played in the Damallsvenskan, firstly for Mallbackens IF and in July she signed with Eskilstuna United DFF. On 1 September 2015, it was announced by Eskilstuna United that Bethke requested the termination of her contract, as she decided to retired from football.

International career
Bethke was part of the United States U23 squad for the 2011 Four Nations Tournament.

Illinois Intramural Career
Currently playing for Learned Foot at the University of Illinois.

References

External links
 
 Katie Bethke at DFB 
 
 
 
 

1988 births
Living people
American women's soccer players
Minnesota Golden Gophers women's soccer players
Atlanta Beat (WPS) players
Arna-Bjørnar players
Bayer 04 Leverkusen (women) players
Frauen-Bundesliga players
American expatriate women's soccer players
American expatriate sportspeople in Norway
Expatriate women's footballers in Norway
Mallbackens IF players
Eskilstuna United DFF players
Expatriate women's footballers in Sweden
Toppserien players
Avaldsnes IL players
Damallsvenskan players
Women's association football forwards
Women's Professional Soccer players
Ottawa Fury (women) players
USL W-League (1995–2015) players
Expatriate women's soccer players in Canada
American expatriate soccer players
American expatriate sportspeople in Canada
American expatriate soccer players in Germany
Boston Renegades players